HMS Patriot was a  that served in the British Royal Navy. The destroyer entered service in 1915 during the First World War and saw service with the Grand Fleet. Following the war, the destroyer was declared surplus and in 1920, the ship was transferred to the Royal Canadian Navy. Recommissioned as HMCS Patriot, the destroyer was used primarily as a training ship. Patriot was taken out of service in 1927, sold for scrap in 1929 and broken up.

Design and description
The ship was propelled by three shafts driven by Brown-Curtis turbines powered by three Yarrow boilers creating . The destroyer carried  of fuel oil.

The destroyer was armed with three quick-firing (QF) /45 calibre Mark IV guns in single mounts. The No.2 4-inch gun was placed on a bandstand, unlike earlier M-class destroyers. For secondary armament, the destroyer was equipped with a single QF 2-pounder "pom-pom" Mk.II and four  torpedo tubes in two twin mounts. As a Thornycroft "special", Patriot resembled the standard Admiralty version of the class with the exception of her flat-sided funnels and higher freeboard.

Service history

Royal Navy
Patriot was one of two Thornycroft M-class destroyers ordered in February 1915 as part of the Fourth War Construction Programme, along with 15 of the standard Admiralty design. She was laid down at Thornycroft & Company's Southampton shipyard in July 1915. The ship was launched on 20 April 1916 and completed in June 1916.

Patriot saw extensive service for the remainder of the First World War. On commissioning, Patriot joined the recently formed 14th Destroyer Flotilla, part of the Grand Fleet. The other five destroyers carried Kite balloons to aid the spotting and tracking of enemy submarines. The patrol made several sightings of a submarine, but did not manage to bring it to action before a shortage of hydrogen for the balloons on 8 July forced the flotilla to return to Scapa Flow. On 11 July, Patriot set out as part of another sweep by kite balloon equipped destroyers against German submarines. On 12 July, the observer aboard Patriots balloon spotted a submarine on the surface. In October 1917, Patriot formed part of a large-scale operation, involving 30 cruisers and 54 destroyers deployed in eight groups across the North Sea in an attempt to stop a suspected sortie by German naval forces.

She maintained continuous operations both as a convoy escort, and in harbour protection.  Patriot remained part of the 14th Destroyer Flotilla at the end of the war. Following the end of the war, the Grand Fleet was abolished, forming the Atlantic Fleet, with more modern destroyers (mainly the V and W classes and the S class) supporting the fleet, while older destroyers went to subsidiary tasks or were laid up. Patriot was sent to the Firth of Forth, joining the Local Defence Flotilla. By November 1919, she was laid up in reserve at HMNB Portsmouth.

Royal Canadian Navy
In March 1920, the Canadian government accepted the British offer of a cruiser and two destroyers. Patriot, along with her sister  were chosen for transfer in September 1920, needing some modernization which included enclosing the bridge. Patriot, Patrician and the cruiser  were commissioned into the Royal Canadian Navy on 1 November 1920 at Devonport and departed for Halifax, Nova Scotia one month later.

Patriot saw immediate service patrolling the waters off Canada's Atlantic coast. The destroyer performed training duties and patrols for the next five years while based out of Halifax. On 10 May 1921, Patriot went aground, for which the commanding officer and navigation officer were later court martialled. Aurora, Patrician and Patriot performed a training cruise to the West Indies in spring/summer 1921. During a visit to Puntarenas, Costa Rica, the Canadian vessels supported negotiations by the Royal Bank of Canada in a dispute over oil with the Costa Rican government. In September 1921, Patriot assisted Alexander Graham Bell's hydrofoil research by towing his high speed experimental hydrofoil  HD-4. This experiment was conducted on the waters of Baddeck Bay in the Bras d'Or Lake estuary near the village of Baddeck, Nova Scotia.

Patriot remained as the only major warship of the Royal Canadian Navy in Halifax following budget cuts in 1922. She was used to train the newly formed Royal Canadian Naval Volunteer Reserve. Roughly once a year, Patriot sailed to the West Indies to take part in naval exercises with the Royal Navy. By 1927, the Royal Canadian Navy began looking for replacements for Patriot and Patrician. By the end of the year, the Canadian government had purchased two new destroyers from the United Kingdom. Patriot was paid off in December 1927 and sold for scrap and broken up at Briton Ferry, Wales in 1929.

Commanding officers

With Royal Canadian Navy
LT C.T. Beard (RCN) 1/11/1920  – 2/9/1922
LT George C. Jones (RCN) 3/9/1922  – 23/8/1923 
LT H.E. Reid (RCN) 24/8/1923  – 6/10/1926
LT C.R.H. Taylor (RCN) 7/10/1925  – 4/4/1926
LCDR C.R.H. Taylor (RCN) 5/4/1926  – 23/10/1927

References

Notes

Citations

References

External links
 HMCS Patriot at readyayeready

 

Thornycroft M-class destroyers
Ships built in Southampton
1916 ships
World War I destroyers of the United Kingdom
World War I naval ships of Canada